Dankin is an unincorporated community in Newcombe Rural Municipality No. 260, Saskatchewan, Canada. The community is located 9 km east of the Town of Eatonia on highway 44 along the Canadian National Railway subdivision. The name "Dankin" is a combination of the last names of Bob Daniels and Bill King, early settlers in the area.

See also 

 List of communities in Saskatchewan
 List of geographic names derived from portmanteaus

References

External links
 Dankin on Grain Elevators of Canada

Newcombe No. 260, Saskatchewan
Unincorporated communities in Saskatchewan